Karol-Ann Canuel (born 18 April 1988) is a Canadian former racing cyclist, who rode professionally between 2010 and 2021 for the ,  and  teams.

Career
In 2016, she was named in Canada's 2016 Olympic team. She was part of the squads that won the women's team time trial world championship for three consecutive years, in 2014, 2015 and 2016.

She represented Canada at the 2020 Summer Olympics. Canuel retired from competition after the 2021 UCI Road World Championships in Flanders, having extended her career by a season to compete in the COVID-19 pandemic-delayed Olympics.

Major results

2006
 5th Road race, UCI Juniors World Championships
2009
 Canada Summer Games
3rd  Criterium
3rd  Time trial
2011
 2nd Overall Tour de Bretagne Féminin
 4th Overall Tour Féminin en Limousin
 7th Grand Prix Cycliste de Gatineau
2012
 5th Overall Tour Cycliste Féminin International de l'Ardèche
 9th Overall La Route de France
 9th Trofeo Alfredo Binda-Comune di Cittiglio
 10th La Flèche Wallonne Féminine
2013
 3rd Overall Tour Cycliste Féminin International de l'Ardèche
1st Stage 5
 5th GP de Plouay
 6th Overall Tour Féminin en Limousin
 6th Overall Trophée d'Or Féminin
 7th Road race, Jeux de la Francophonie
 8th Road race, Pan American Road Championships
2014
 UCI Road World Championships
1st  Team time trial
6th Time trial
 1st Open de Suède Vårgårda TTT
 10th Ronde van Overijssel
2015
 1st  Team time trial, UCI Road World Championships
 1st  Time trial, National Road Championships
 1st Stage 4 Gracia–Orlová
 2nd Overall Thüringen Rundfahrt der Frauen
1st Stage 7
 2nd Chrono Gatineau
 2nd Crescent Women World Cup Vårgårda TTT
2016
 1st  Team time trial, UCI Road World Championships
 1st Crescent Vårgårda UCI Women's WorldTour TTT
 2nd Time trial, National Road Championships
 3rd Chrono Gatineau
 4th Overall Holland Ladies Tour
1st Stage 2 (TTT)
2017
 1st  Time trial, National Road Championships
 1st Crescent Vårgårda UCI Women's WorldTour TTT
 2nd  Team time trial, UCI Road World Championships
 2nd Chrono Gatineau
 8th Overall Giro d'Italia Femminile
1st Stage 1 (TTT)
2018
 1st Crescent Vårgårda TTT
 UCI Road World Championships
2nd  Team time trial
6th Road race
8th Time trial
 2nd Time trial, National Road Championships
 2nd Chrono Gatineau
 7th Grand Prix Cycliste de Gatineau
 8th Trofeo Alfredo Binda-Comune di Cittiglio
2019
 National Road Championships
1st  Road race
2nd Time trial
 6th Overall Madrid Challenge by la Vuelta
 9th Overall Setmana Ciclista Valenciana
2020
 9th Strade Bianche Women
2021
 5th Overall Belgium Tour

See also
 2014 Specialized–lululemon season

References

External links
 
 
 
 
 
 
 
 

1988 births
Living people
Canadian female cyclists
People from Amos, Quebec
Sportspeople from Quebec
UCI Road World Champions (women)
Cyclists at the 2016 Summer Olympics
Cyclists at the 2020 Summer Olympics
Olympic cyclists of Canada
20th-century Canadian women
21st-century Canadian women